Manchiki Maro Peru is a 1976 Indian Telugu-language action drama film, produced by M. Manohar under the Sree Ramakrishna Films banner and directed by C. S. Rao. It stars N. T. Rama Rao, Krishnam Raju, Padmapriya and music composed by S. Rajeswara Rao.

Plot 
The film begins with a rectitude Jayanth whose guidance molds his close friends Ravi, Chandrika, and sibling Kiran molds as police, lawyer, & journalist respectively. Jayanth works as a security officer in a temple, which is headed by trustee Ramadasu and his younger one Bhujangam is a gangster who smuggles the idols of gods. Parallelly, Bhushaiah & Seshayya are his partners. Ravi is the son of Bhushiah and Sheshiah's daughter is Dr. Neelima Jayanth's beloved. Ravi & Chandrika also love each other. Meanwhile, Jayanth identifies the fraudulence in the temple but on request of Ramadasu maintains silence and resigns. Thereafter, Jayanth joins the trade union leader at Bhujangam's factory where too, he combats for the workers' welfare and develops enmity with the management. 

So, Bhujangam intrigues and sentences Jayanth under false allegation. In prison, he is acquainted with a goon Gangulu and the two be friends. Parallelly, Ravi, Kiran, Chandrika, and Neelima prove Jayanth as nonguilty and acquits him. Besides, Kiran exposes the enormities of the Bhujangam via his news articles. Hence, enranged brutal Bhujangam blasts Kiran's press in which their sister dies. As of now, Jayanth comprehends that counterattack is the way to rectify to this society. Thus, he turns into a gangster mingling with Gangulu. Meanwhile, Ravi & Kiran suspect and chases him. Surprisingly, at last, Gangulu is CID officer Anand Mohan, who has plotted with Jayanth to eradicate the scandals in the country. Moreover, they detect the chieftain ss Ramadasu. Finally, the movie ends with Jayanth ceasing the baddies and establishing peace in society.

Cast 
N. T. Rama Rao as Jayanth
Krishnam Raju as Kiran
Padmapriya as Neelima
Satyanarayana as Ananda Mohan / Gangulu
Ramakrishna as Ravi
Prabhakar Reddy as Ramadasu & Bhujangam (Dual Role)
Nagabhushanam as Bhusaiah
Allu Ramalingaiah as Seshayya
Mukkamala as Manager
Sarath Babu as Ashok
G. Varalakshmi as Jayanth's mother
Prabha as Chandrika
Jayamalini as Chenchela

Soundtrack 
Music composed by S. Rajeswara Rao.

References

External links 
 

1970s action drama films
1970s Telugu-language films
1976 drama films
1976 films
Films directed by C. S. Rao
Films scored by S. Rajeswara Rao
Indian action drama films